Perrotia kingdoni is a butterfly in the family Hesperiidae. It is found in central Madagascar. The habitat consists of forests.

References

Butterflies described in 1879
Erionotini
Butterflies of Africa
Taxa named by Arthur Gardiner Butler